Frank Briant (30 November 1865 – 1 September 1934) was a radical British Liberal Party politician who served as a Member of Parliament for Lambeth North. In addition, he represented Lambeth on the London County Council and was a leading member of Lambeth Borough Council.

Background
He was born in  Kennington to William and Susannah Briant. He started work as a civil servant. In 1887, he started working at the Alford House Institute for Workingmen and Lads. In religion, he was a Congregationalist.

Political career
He served for 10 years as Chairman of the Lambeth Board of Guardians. He was a Justice of the peace for London.
He was a member of Lambeth Borough Council, the London County Council and the House of Commons. He was first elected to Lambeth Council and was elected Chairman of the Council in 1899, a position he held for twenty years. 
He was elected as a Progressive Party member to the London County Council in 1905 representing Lambeth North. He served as both a borough and county councillor through to the end of World War I. In 1912, he was selected as the Liberal prospective parliamentary candidate for Lambeth North but due to the outbreak of war; had to wait until the 1918 general election. He was comfortably re-elected to the LCC in 1913 suggesting that he may well have gained the parliamentary seat in a 1915 general election;

Despite his Unionist opponent receiving the 'coupon' letter of support from the Coalition Government he gained the seat from the Unionists. His election was one of only a handful of gains made by the Liberals at these elections. 

In 1919, due to the commencement of his parliamentary career, he stood down from the Chairmanship of Lambeth Council, and retired from the London County Council.

He retained his seat in the House of Commons at every subsequent election

During the 1924–29 parliament which was dominated by a Unionist majority, Briant worked closely with a group of radical Liberal MPs that included William Wedgwood Benn, Percy Harris, Joseph Kenworthy and Horace Crawfurd to provide opposition to the government. 
He lost his seat to Labour in the 1929 General Election

In 1931 he returned to municipal politics and was re-elected to the London County Council again representing Lambeth North. Later that year he regained his Lambeth North seat in the House of Commons, defeating the Labour candidate at the 1931 General Election

He remained a London County Councillor up until the Match 1934 elections. He continued to represent Lambeth North in the House of Commons until his death. He died on 1 September 1934 at the Alford House Institute for Workingmen and Lads of which he had been the superintendent for 47 years.

See also
List of Liberal Party (UK) MPs

External links
 
 
Leigh Rayment's peerage page – https://web.archive.org/web/20180914195349/http://www.leighrayment.com/commons/Lcommons1.htm
POLITICS & PEOPLE OF LONDON – London County Council 1889–1965: https://books.google.com/books?id=A1yI5GjsmNsC&printsec=frontcover&dq=The+Story+of+the+London+County+Council&hl=en&sa=X&ei=sczwUrbpNaGS7Aa12YGICg&ved=0CDEQ6AEwAA#v=onepage&q&f=false

References

1865 births
1934 deaths
Liberal Party (UK) MPs for English constituencies
Members of London County Council
UK MPs 1918–1922
UK MPs 1922–1923
UK MPs 1923–1924
UK MPs 1924–1929
UK MPs 1931–1935
People from Kennington
Progressive Party (London) politicians
Members of Lambeth Metropolitan Borough Council